Scott Yearwood is a Canadian retired ice hockey goaltender who was an All-American for St. Lawrence.

Career
Yearwood began attending St. Lawrence University in 1983 but didn't play with the ice hockey team until the following year. He was a serviceable goaltender in his first two seasons as a starter but the team improved mightily in his senior season. Yearwood's goals against average dropped by more than a full point and he finished in the top 5 in the nation. He was named an All-American while helping the Saints to their best finish in decades. In the ECAC Tournament, St. Lawrence made the championship game for the first time in 22 years and, though they lost, the team earned a bid to the NCAA Tournament. The Larries had the misfortune to be set against the #1 seed and fell to eventual champion North Dakota. While Yearwood still have a year of eligibility left, he graduated in 1987 and was invited to Montreal's training camp. Nothing came to fruition and he retired as a player.

He moved to Ontario and began working as a sales representative. He spent several years as a senior account manager and eventually worked his way up to becoming a Vice President for Redwolf Security.

Statistics

Regular season and playoffs

Awards and honors

References

External links

1963 births
Living people
AHCA Division I men's ice hockey All-Americans
Canadian ice hockey goaltenders
Ice hockey people from New Brunswick
Sportspeople from Moncton
St. Lawrence Saints men's ice hockey players